Sonic Runners Adventure is an endless runner platform game published by Gameloft for iOS, Android and Java-based mobile phones. As part of the Sonic the Hedgehog series, the game serves as a sequel to 2015's Sonic Runners. The game was first released in select regions in June 2017 and worldwide in August 2017.

Gameplay

Similar to its predecessor Sonic Runners, Sonic Runners Adventure is a platform game with endless runner elements. Players choose between several different characters, each with unique abilities. Players must guide their chosen character through a series of levels based on locations in Sonic Generations and Sonic Lost World. Characters automatically move forward, so players must tap their screen to avoid obstacles and enemies. Scattered around levels are golden rings, which serve as a form of health: rings protect the player from enemies or obstacles, though they scatter when the player is hit and blink before disappearing. Several changes from the original game have been made as well; the game can be played offline, and there are three types of levels in the game: "Finite", "Looped", and "Infinite".

Development
The game was launched in PAL regions on June 10, 2017. When the game was initially released back in August, the game was made exclusive to Gameloft's store in which players had to pay to download the app. The game was later released on the App Store and Google Play on December 20, 2017.

Reception

Carter Dotson of TouchArcade expressed hope that an iOS version of the game would be released, and praised the fact that it was a game with a fixed price, rather than the original Runner freemium approach. It holds a Metacritic score of 78 out 100, indicating "generally favorable reviews", with the gameplay, level design and presentation receiving praise.

References

2017 video games
Android (operating system) games
IOS games
Platform games
Endless runner games
Gameloft games
Video games developed in France
Sonic the Hedgehog spin-off games
J2ME games
Single-player video games